Yevdokiyevka is a rural locality (a selo) in Mitrofanovskoye Rural Settlement, Kantemirovsky  District, Voronezh Oblast, Russia. The population was 478 as of 2010. There are 3 streets.

Geography 
Mitrofanovka is the nearest rural locality.

References 

Rural localities in Kantemirovsky District